Maisons-Alfort–Stade is a station on line 8 of the Paris Métro in the commune of Maisons-Alfort.

The station opened on 19 September 1970 with the extension of the line from Porte de Charenton–Écoles. It was the eastern terminus of the line until its extension to Maisons-Alfort–Les Juilliottes on 27 April 1972.

Station layout

Paris Métro stations in Maisons-Alfort
Railway stations in France opened in 1970